Andrew Castle and Roberto Saad were the defending champions but only Castle competed that year with Robert Van't Hof.

Castle and Van't Hof lost in the quarterfinals to Scott Davis and Paul Wekesa.

Davis and Wekesa won in the final 6–2, 6–4 against John Letts and Bruce Man-Son-Hing.

Seeds

  Brad Drewett /  John Fitzgerald (first round)
  Andrew Castle /  Robert Van't Hof (quarterfinals)
  Mark Kratzmann /  Glenn Layendecker (first round)
  Broderick Dyke /  Tobias Svantesson (first round)

Draw

References

External links
 1989 Seoul Open Doubles draw

Doubles